Anolis guafe, the Cabo Cruz banded anole, is a species of lizard in the family Dactyloidae. The species is found in Cuba.

References

Anoles
Endemic fauna of Cuba
Reptiles of Cuba
Reptiles described in 1991
Taxa named by Alberto R. Estrada
Taxa named by Orlando H. Garrido